Aslam Kader (born 9 December 1962, Mumbai, India) is a noted former Indian champion jockey.

Kader has ridden over 1700 winning horses, including 75 wins in classic horse races over his two-decade career. Aslam Kader has won the Champion Jockeys title at every racing centre in India. He has won the title nine times at the Bangalore Center and thrice in Mumbai. He holds the record for having ridden the maximum of numbers in one season at Mumbai, which stands at 77.

In September 2003, Kader fractured his collarbone due to a fall in a Pune race track incident. He later attempted to make a comeback but was unsuccessful, and had to retire. In 2005, he took part in an exhibition match-race, titled `Clash of Legends' in Mumbai, where riding horse  Live Legend, he beat Pesi Shroff, who was riding, Sail Away.

References

External links
 Aslam Kader profile at IndiaRace.com

Indian jockeys
1962 births
Living people
Sportspeople from Mumbai
Indian male equestrians
Equestrians from Maharashtra